Kosmonova (born Michael Nehrig; 8 April 1970 in Krefeld, Germany) is a German DJ and music producer. He was part of the group Royal Gigolos in the 2000s.

Discography

Albums

Singles

"—" denotes a single that did not chart

Remixes

References

External links
 (in German)

1970 births
German DJs
German electronic musicians
Musicians from North Rhine-Westphalia
German record producers
German trance musicians
Living people
Electronic dance music DJs
People from Krefeld